Krystian Lupa (born 7 November 1943) is a Polish theatre director, set designer, playwright, translator and pedagogue. He has been called "the greatest living European theatre director".

Life and work
He studied physics at the Jagiellonian University in Krakow, between 1963 and 1969 he studied graphics at the Kraków Academy of Fine Arts, also film directing at the National Higher School of Film in Łódź and finally, theatre directing at the Ludwik Solski Academy for the Dramatic Arts. In  Lodz he started to collaborate with Konrad Swinarski, and was influenced by the works of Tadeusz Kantor. In 1976, he made his debut as a director by staging Sławomir Mrożek's play The Slaughterhouse at the Juliusz Słowacki Theatre in Kraków where he worked for many years. He also worked at the Cyprian Kamil Norwid Theatre in Jelenia Góra. Lupa is renowned for his specific methods of working with the text and actors in very organic way also known as "laboratory rehearsals".

During his career he made a lot of notable productions based on texts of Robert Musil, Thomas Bernhard, Fyodor Dostoyevsky, Rainer Maria Rilke, Stanisław Ignacy Witkiewicz or Witold Gombrowicz.

He was awarded with numerous prominent awards which include Witkacy Prize – Critics' Circle Award, Gold Gloria Artis Medal, Order of Polonia Restituta, Ordre des Arts et des Lettres, Europe Theatre Prize and Austrian Decoration for Science and Art. In 2014, he received the Nestroy Theatre Prize for the staging of Thomas Bernhard's 1986 novel Woodcutters. He also received two nominations to Poland's top literary prize, the Nike Award, in 2002 for Labirynt and in 2004 for Podglądania.

In 2016, he received the Golden Cross of the Stage Award in Lithuanina for staging Thomas Bernhard's play 'Heldenplatz' (Heroes' Square) in Lithuanian National Drama Theatre. In 2017, he became a member of the Polish Academy of Arts and Sciences.

Europe Theatre Prize 
In 2009, he was awarded the XIII Europe Theatre Prize, in Wrocław. The prize organization stated:The awarding of the 13th Europe Theatre Prize to Krystian Lupa, confirms Poland’s pivotal role on the European theatre scene. A pupil of Tadeusz Kantor, and himself a teacher of many artists – among whom we should mention Krzysztof Warlikowski, 10th Europe Prize Theatrical Realities – Krystian Lupa combines an academic training with an inexhaustible creative vein that has always been present in and distinguished his work, and has enabled him in the course of his career to take on and ingeniously adapt for the theatre the works of classic literary authors such as Robert Musil, Feyodor Dostoevsky, Rainer Maria Rilke, Thomas Bernhardt, Anton Cechov, Werner Schwab, Mikhail Bulgakov, Friedrich Nietzsche.

Personal life 
In 2008, he publicly came out as gay in an interview for Film magazine. His life partner is actor Piotr Skiba.

References

External links

 culture.pl

People from Jastrzębie-Zdrój
Polish theatre directors
Polish male dramatists and playwrights
Living people
1943 births
Polish LGBT dramatists and playwrights
LGBT theatre directors
Gay dramatists and playwrights